Matthew Hilton (born December 27, 1965) is a Canadian former boxer who was the IBF Junior Middleweight Champion of the World. He is the younger brother of former super middleweight world champion, Dave Hilton Jr..

He started boxing professionally in early 1983, and while doing so lived (along with his father/trainer and other family members) a nomadic lifestyle, moving from place to place in a 'movable trailer.'

Fighting style
It was tough growing up for Hilton, but he transferred that toughness to the ring, at least as his career started.  Though Matthew had decent boxing skills for a brawler, he preferred to press forward, back up his opponents, and detonate his punishing left hooks, and powerful overhand rights. Two of the big names he faced in his rise to stardom were former 3-time world champion Wilfred Benítez and former world middleweight champion Vito Antuofermo, who both fell victim to his devastating KO power.  He won the IBF junior middleweight title, and brought Canada its first world boxing title since the 1940s, with a 15-round unanimous decision over defender Buster Drayton on ABC in Montreal, June 27, 1987, which was also named KO Magazines TV Fight of the Year for 1987. He made one defense on the Tyson-Biggs undercard on HBO in October of that year, busting and bruising up a totally outclassed Jack Callahan before the referee called things off after two rounds. His next fight was an exciting non-title bout on ESPN in the middleweight division against Paul Whitaker of New Orleans, who was knocked down and brutally battered by Hilton before being KO'd in the fourth round. Matthew then apparently had the upper hand in the early going in his next defense - a November 1988 matchup with Robert Hines on Showtime.

After knocking a bloodied Hines down twice, he let Hines back in the fight, and Hines steadily hammered a very tired and not very well prepared Hilton in winning a come-from-behind 12-round unanimous decision, after which Hilton would be champ no more. Hilton admitted after the fight that he had sustained rib injury during training for that fight (Between rounds, Hilton could be heard telling his father that he couldn't throw his left hand). Matthew later rebounded with a lackluster (though controversial) draw against Fermin Chirino, a bout in which many felt that Matthew had won by a 10-round unanimous decision, followed by two more exciting bouts against journeyman Tim T. Williams (on ESPN), who was KO'd in round 10, and Tennessee toughman Knox Brown, who had only previously been down at the hands of John Mugabi, and was again floored by Hilton in a 10-round decision victory on the USA Network.  His last crack at a title was on the Foreman–Cooney undercard in January 1990, when his eyes were again swollen shut by the punches of defending WBO middleweight titlist Doug DeWitt.

Injuries and Retirement
This time, though he fought gamely, Hilton was the loser not by decision but rather by 11th-round TKO when his father had seen enough and did not let him fight the last round. Hilton's eyes were both swollen completely closed. His cutman only had ice to decrease the swelling, which was ineffective. Because of that fight, he suffered a retina injury which followed him for his next few fights before forcing him into retirement.  Hilton received many unsuccessful surgeries for his eyes.  His career began to sputter during the 1990s, and, partly due to the various troubles plaguing the Hilton family, Hilton never was really able to regain his championship-level caliber. He said he's never been as much motivated for training after he won the IBF's belt against Buster Drayton.

Professional boxing record

|-
|align="center" colspan=8|32 Wins (24 knockouts, 8 decisions), 3 Losses (1 knockout, 2 decisions), 2 Draws 
|-
| align="center" style="border-style: none none solid solid; background: #e3e3e3"|Result
| align="center" style="border-style: none none solid solid; background: #e3e3e3"|Record
| align="center" style="border-style: none none solid solid; background: #e3e3e3"|Opponent
| align="center" style="border-style: none none solid solid; background: #e3e3e3"|Type
| align="center" style="border-style: none none solid solid; background: #e3e3e3"|Round
| align="center" style="border-style: none none solid solid; background: #e3e3e3"|Date
| align="center" style="border-style: none none solid solid; background: #e3e3e3"|Location
| align="center" style="border-style: none none solid solid; background: #e3e3e3"|Notes
|-align=center
|Loss
|32–3–2
|align=left| Darrell Flint
|UD
|10
|27/05/1993
|align=left| Halifax Forum, Halifax, Nova Scotia
|
|-
|Draw
|32–2–2
|align=left| Kevin Daigle
|PTS
|10
|11/02/1992
|align=left| Verdun, Quebec
|
|-
|Win
|32–2–1
|align=left| Clarence White
|UD
|10
|12/11/1991
|align=left| Verdun Auditorium, Verdun, Quebec
|
|-
|Win
|31–2–1
|align=left| Knox Brown
|UD
|10
|31/07/1990
|align=left| Northlands Agricom, Edmonton, Alberta
|
|-
|Loss
|30–2–1
|align=left| Doug DeWitt
|RTD
|11
|15/01/1990
|align=left| Atlantic City Convention Center, Atlantic City, New Jersey
|align=left|
|-
|Draw
|30–1–1
|align=left| Fermin Chirino
|PTS
|10
|19/12/1989
|align=left| Caesars Atlantic City, Atlantic City, New Jersey
|
|-
|Win
|30–1
|align=left| Tim Williams
|TKO
|10
|10/10/1989
|align=left| Bally's Las Vegas, Las Vegas, Nevada
|
|-
|Loss
|29–1
|align=left| Robert Hines
|UD
|12
|04/11/1988
|align=left| Las Vegas Hilton, Las Vegas, Nevada
|align=left|
|-
|Win
|29–0
|align=left| Paul Whittaker
|TKO
|4
|29/07/1988
|align=left| Caesars Palace, Las Vegas, Nevada
|
|-
|Win
|28–0
|align=left| Jack Callahan
|TKO
|2
|16/10/1987
|align=left| Boardwalk Hall, Atlantic City, New Jersey
|align=left|
|-
|Win
|27–0
|align=left| Buster Drayton
|UD
|15
|27/06/1987
|align=left| Montreal Forum, Montreal, Quebec
|align=left|
|-
|Win
|26–0
|align=left| Muhammad Eltassi
|TKO
|2
|29/04/1987
|align=left| Paul Sauve Arena, Montreal, Quebec
|
|-
|Win
|25–0
|align=left| William Clayton
|KO
|2
|12/12/1986
|align=left| Madison Square Garden, New York City
|
|-
|Win
|24–0
|align=left| Franklin Owens
|TKO
|2
|22/11/1986
|align=left| Las Vegas Hilton, Las Vegas, Nevada
|
|-
|Win
|23–0
|align=left| Aniseto Ramos
|PTS
|10
|13/06/1986
|align=left| Madison Square Garden, New York City
|align=left|
|-
|Win
|22–0
|align=left| Bobby McCorvey
|KO
|1
|20/05/1986
|align=left| Madison Square Garden, New York City
|
|-
|Win
|21–0
|align=left| Bruce Jackson
|TKO
|5
|19/04/1986
|align=left| Las Vegas Hilton, Las Vegas, Nevada
|
|-
|Win
|20–0
|align=left| Wilfred Benítez
|KO
|9
|15/02/1986
|align=left| Paul Sauve Arena, Montreal, Quebec
|
|-
|Win
|19–0
|align=left| Vito Antuofermo
|RTD
|4
|20/10/1985
|align=left| Montreal Forum, Montreal, Quebec
|
|-
|Win
|18–0
|align=left| Lopez McGee
|TKO
|4
|06/09/1985
|align=left| Tamiami Fairgrounds Auditorium, Miami, Florida
|
|-
|Win
|17–0
|align=left| Roberto Hernandez
|TKO
|9
|29/04/1985
|align=left| Buffalo Memorial Auditorium, Buffalo, New York
|
|-
|Win
|16–0
|align=left| Francisco De Jesus
|UD
|10
|22/01/1985
|align=left| Montreal Forum, Montreal, Quebec
|
|-
|Win
|15–0
|align=left| Bill Bradley
|RTD
|3
|11/12/1984
|align=left| Paul Sauve Arena, Montreal, Quebec
|
|-
|Win
|14–0
|align=left| Sam Gervins
|UD
|10
|14/10/1984
|align=left| Montreal Forum, Montreal, Quebec
|
|-
|Win
|13–0
|align=left| Ronald Thermidor
|TKO
|2
|10/07/1984
|align=left| Montreal Forum, Montreal, Quebec
|
|-
|Win
|12–0
|align=left| Nino Gonzalez
|KO
|8
|01/06/1984
|align=left| Montreal Forum, Montreal, Quebec
|
|-
|Win
|11–0
|align=left| Reggie Ford
|TKO
|1
|30/04/1984
|align=left| Hall de l'Exposition, Quebec City, Quebec
|
|-
|Win
|10–0
|align=left| Eddie Hollett
|TKO
|5
|04/12/1983
|align=left| Montreal Forum, Montreal, Quebec
|
|-
|Win
|9–0
|align=left| Hardy Jones
|RTD
|5
|10/11/1983
|align=left| Paul Sauve Arena, Montreal, Quebec
|align=left|
|-
|Win
|8–0
|align=left| Frank Mackey
|TKO
|3
|23/08/1983
|align=left| Le Carrefour Sports Centre, Laval, Quebec
|
|-
|Win
|7–0
|align=left| Harold France
|KO
|3
|29/07/1983
|align=left| Cornwall, Ontario
|align=left|
|-
|Win
|6–0
|align=left| Clinton Harris
|KO
|4
|21/06/1983
|align=left| Paul Sauve Arena, Montreal, Quebec
|
|-
|Win
|5–0
|align=left| Mike Essett
|UD
|6
|24/05/1983
|align=left| Paul Sauve Arena, Montreal, Quebec
|
|-
|Win
|4–0
|align=left| Jacques DeBlois
|TKO
|3
|26/04/1983
|align=left| Paul Sauve Arena, Montreal, Quebec
|
|-
|Win
|3–0
|align=left| Frank Minnigan
|UD
|4
|29/03/1983
|align=left| Paul Sauve Arena, Montreal, Quebec
|
|-
|Win
|2–0
|align=left| Adrian Green
|TKO
|3
|15/02/1983
|align=left| Paul Sauve Arena, Montreal, Quebec
|
|-
|Win
|1–0
|align=left| Denis Brisson
|TKO
|2
|25/01/1983
|align=left| Paul Sauve Arena, Montreal, Quebec
|align=left|
|}

References

External links

1965 births
Living people
Boxers from Montreal
Anglophone Quebec people
Canadian male boxers
Middleweight boxers